The 1953 season was Cherno More's second consecutive season in Republican Football Group A after being administratively relegated in 1949 and returning to the top flight in 1952. The club competed as VMS Stalin after Varna was renamed after the Soviet dictator in December 1949. Cherno more finished in 3rd place which was the club's highest post-war league finish until it was matched in 2008-2009.

Republican Football Group A

Matches

Varna was renamed Stalin after Soviet dictator Joseph Stalin from 20 December 1949 to 20 October 1956;
 Pernik was renamed Dimitrovo after Bulgarian Communist leader Georgi Dimitrov from 1949 to 1962;
Dupnitsa was renamed Stanke Dimitrov in 1950 after the Communist party activist. Cherveno zname is a former name of Marek;
 CSKA Sofia participated as Sofiyski Garnizon (Sofia Garrison);
Dinamo Sofia is a former name of Levski Sofia;
Udarnik Sofia is a former name of Slavia Sofia;
DNA Plovdiv is a former name of Botev Plovdiv.
A unified team composed of players from various teams took part in the league until July 1953 in order to help the national team prepare for the 1954 FIFA World Cup qualification campaign. The idea was abandoned after the national team's defeat against Romania on 28 June 1953. The team's participation meant the fixtures were subject to heavy rescheduling, which was later recognized as a mistake by the Football Union.

League standings

Results summary

Bulgarian Cup

Squad

References

External links
 http://www.retro-football.bg/?q=bg/1953
 https://bulgarian-football.com/archive/1953/a-grupa.html
 http://www.retro-football.bg/sites/default/files/books/almanah_1954.pdf

PFC Cherno More Varna seasons
Cherno More Varna
Cherno More Varna